Time Is Up is a 2021 Italian romantic drama film directed by Elisa Amoruso from a screenplay she co-wrote with Lorenzo Ura and Patrizia Fiorellini. The film stars Bella Thorne, Benjamin Mascolo, Nikolay Moss, Roberto Davide and Sebastiano Pigazzi.

The film was released in the United States on 9 September 2021 by Voltage Pictures and in Italy on 25 October 2021 by 01 Distribution. It was panned by critics and audience for the acting and screenplay but was praised for its music.

Plot
Vivien is a high school student who loves math and physics. Steve is the clean-cut star of the high school swim team, and Vivien's boyfriend. Roy on the other hand is poor, has many tattoos, and is underperforming on the swim team. If he doesn't improve his times, he'll miss out on a college scholarship and be forced to work at his dad's garage.

Vivien's suspicion that her mother is having an affair is confirmed when she trails her mother and sees her indiscreetly making out with another man at a local restaurant.

Steve is an inattentive boyfriend. He has been disappearing without calling or texting to let Vivien know where he is. Vivien is unhappy because of Steve, and not confident of her knowledge, she puts off taking her physics test.

Steve has been remote with Vivien because he is in a relationship with Dylan, the swim coach. Roy has seen Steve and Dylan kissing, but he hasn't said anything. Nevertheless, Steve has threatened Roy about keeping the secret. Steve and Roy go to Rome for a swim meet.

Vivien confronts her mother and learns that her parents separated a year ago. Distraught, she goes to Rome to be with Steve, but ends up spending the day walking around the city with Roy. At the end of the day, they kiss. Embarrassed, Vivien goes back to her room, only to find Steve and his coach in bed together. Shocked and heartbroken, Vivien runs out of the hotel with Roy chasing after her. She goes into a dark street and is hit by a car.

After initial treatment by the doctors in Rome, Vivien is transported to a hospital back home. When she wakes up, she doesn't remember anything that happened in Rome. Steve lies to her that she spent the day with him, while Roy leaves her alone. Eventually, Vivien remembers what actually happened and goes to meet Roy. Newly confident in herself, she takes her physics test.

Cast

 Bella Thorne as Vivien (December 13th, 1999)
 Benjamin Mascolo as Roy (August 12th, 1999)
 Sebastiano Pigazzi as Steve
 Bonnie Baddoo as Vivien's friend
 Nikolay Moss as Dylan, the swim coach
 Emma Lo Bianco as Sarah, Vivien's mother
 Giampiero Judica as Vivien's father
 Roberto Davide as Bryan, Roy's father

Production
Principal photography started on 9 November 2020 and concluded on 21 December 2020 in Rome, Italy. Scenes shot in the United States were also included.

Critical reception
Decider suggested that the only performer worth watching was the city of Rome itself, dubbing the rest of the film "a forgettable mess". The review from Common Sense Media suggested that the only good thing in the film was its music, with everything else an example of "what might result when a group of people with short attention spans collaborate." The review from Culture Mix suggested that the "atrocious screenplay" was further hindered by a cast that knew "how to look sullen and bored more than they know how to act."

References

External links
 

2021 films
2021 romantic drama films
2020s English-language films
2020s teen drama films
2020s teen romance films
English-language Italian films
Films shot in Rome
Italian romantic drama films
Italian teen films